Alexander Morrison "Alistair" Carmichael (born 15 July 1965) is a Scottish politician and solicitor by trade who has served as the Member of Parliament (MP) for Orkney and Shetland since 2001.  A Scottish Liberal Democrat politician, he serves as the Liberal Democrat Home Affairs, Northern Ireland and Justice spokesperson. He served as the Deputy Leader of the Scottish Liberal Democrats from 2012 to 2021.

Carmichael served as Liberal Democrat Chief Whip of the House of Commons from 2010 to 2013. From 7 October 2013 to 8 May 2015, he was the Secretary of State for Scotland in the Conservative-Lib Dem coalition government. He served a second term as Chief Whip from 2017 to 2020, having taken over the position from Tom Brake following the 2017 general election. He was the Liberal Democrat Spokesman for Foreign and Commonwealth Affairs and Exiting the European Union from January 2020 to August 2020. On 31 August 2020, new leader Sir Ed Davey appointed Carmichael as Liberal Democrat Home Affairs spokesman. He was the only Scottish MP representing the Liberal Democrats in the House of Commons during the 57th Parliament (2015–2017). He is the longest-serving Liberal Democrat MP in the current UK Parliament.

Early life
Carmichael was born to hill farming parents on Islay in the Inner Hebrides, and went on to attend Port Ellen Primary School and Islay High School. He worked between 1984 and 1989 as a hotel manager after 2 years of study at the University of Glasgow. There, he was a member of the Students' Representative Council and President of the Liberal Club. He ultimately left his course early. He returned to education at the University of Aberdeen, where he gained an LLB in 1992, qualifying as a solicitor in 1993. From 1993 to 1996, he was a Procurator Fiscal Depute for Edinburgh and Aberdeen, and from 1996 to 2001 he was a solicitor with Aberdeen and Macduff.

Political career
Carmichael first stood for Parliament at Paisley South in 1987, being defeated by the sitting Labour MP, Norman Buchan. He was later elected to represent Orkney and Shetland at the 2001 general election, the constituency previously held by Jim Wallace and Jo Grimond. He was appointed Liberal Democrat Northern Ireland and Scotland Spokesman by Sir Menzies Campbell in July 2007, but resigned in March 2008 to vote in favour of a referendum on the Lisbon Treaty. He was reappointed to the position by Nick Clegg in October 2008. He had also briefly served as the Liberal Democrat Home Affairs spokesman, following the resignation of Mark Oaten.

In June 2009, Carmichael was involved in a successful campaign against the book by Max Scratchmann, Chucking it All: How Downsizing to a Windswept Scottish Island Did Absolutely Nothing to Improve My Life, an irreverent account of the author's experience downshifting from Manchester to Orkney, which Carmichael said was "hurtful and vindictive", and attacked a number of "clearly identifiable" residents of the islands. Carmichael's complaints to the publisher led them to cancel publication.

At the beginning of the Liberal Democrat - Conservative coalition government in May 2010, Carmichael was appointed Deputy Chief Whip and Comptroller of the Household.

In 2011, Carmichael was elected Honorary President of the Scottish Liberal Democrats youth wing, Liberal Youth Scotland.

Deputy Leader of the Scottish Liberal Democrats and Secretary of State for Scotland
Carmichael took over from Jo Swinson as Deputy Leader of the Scottish Liberal Democrats on 23 September 2012 at the Annual Liberal Democrat Conference in Brighton.

In October 2013, he was promoted by Nick Clegg to the position of Secretary of State for Scotland in the UK Cabinet, replacing Michael Moore.

2015 general election
Carmichael retained his seat at the 2015 general election, the only Liberal Democrat in Scotland out of 11 MPs elected in 2010 who managed to do so. The Liberal Democrats also lost the majority of their seats in the rest of the UK, and Carmichael was one of only eight Liberal Democrat MPs returned to Parliament.

Following the resignation of Nick Clegg as party leader, Alistair Carmichael took temporary charge of the Liberal Democrats in the House of Commons, under the de facto leadership of Party President Sal Brinton.

Campaign memo and election petition

On 4 April 2015, during the general election campaign Carmichael was involved in the leaking of a memo from the Scotland Office about comments allegedly made by the French ambassador Sylvie Bermann about Nicola Sturgeon, claiming that Sturgeon had privately stated she would "rather see David Cameron remain as PM", in contrast to her publicly stated opposition to a Conservative government. The veracity of the memo was quickly denied by the French ambassador, French Consul General and Sturgeon herself.

At the time of the leak, Carmichael denied all knowledge of the leaking of the memo in a television interview with Channel 4 News. After the election, Carmichael accepted the contents of the memo were incorrect, and admitted that he had lied, and that he had authorised the leaking of the inaccurate memo to the media. This was after a Cabinet Office enquiry identified Carmichael's role in the leak. The enquiry found phone records that proved Euan Roddin, Carmichael's Special Adviser, contacted the Telegraph on 1 April, two days before the story appeared. Carmichael apologised and accepted that had he still been a government minister, this was a matter that would have "required [his] resignation".

Four electors from Orkney and Shetland lodged an election petition on 29 May 2015, the last date possible to do this following the general election on 7 May, attempting to unseat Carmichael and force a by-election. On 2 June 2015, the Parliamentary Standards Commissioner launched an investigation into his conduct, under sections 10, 14 and 16 of the Code of Conduct, but this investigation was dropped because Carmichael became aware of the memo via the Scottish Office and not in his capacity as an MP. On 9 December 2015, it was decided it had not been proven beyond reasonable doubt that he had committed an "illegal practice" and he was allowed to retain his seat. In February 2016, his application for costs was rejected, leaving him £150,000 out of pocket. Scottish Liberal Democrat leader Willie Rennie contributed £750 towards his costs. Carmichael was awarded £50,000 towards the costs from the Joseph Rowntree Reform Trust.

Personal life
He married Kathryn Jane Eastham in 1987. They have two sons (born in 1997 and 2001) and the family reside in Orkney where she is a local veterinary surgeon. He speaks both French and German. Carmichael is an elder in the Church of Scotland.

Electoral history

2019 general election

2017 general election

2015 general election

2010 general election

2005 general election

2001 general election

1987 general election

Notes

References

External links
 Alistair Carmichael MP official constituency website
 Profile at the Liberal Democrats

 Profile at New Statesman
 Election petition, 2015 at orkney.gov.uk

|-

|-

|-

|-

|-

|-

Living people
1965 births
Alumni of the University of Aberdeen
Elders of the Church of Scotland
People from Islay
Members of the Privy Council of the United Kingdom
Members of the Parliament of the United Kingdom for Orkney and Shetland
Scottish Liberal Democrat MPs
Scottish solicitors
Secretaries of State for Scotland
UK MPs 2001–2005
UK MPs 2005–2010
UK MPs 2010–2015
UK MPs 2015–2017
UK MPs 2017–2019
UK MPs 2019–present